The 2009 CIS Women's Volleyball Championship was held February 26, 2009 to February 28, 2009, in Fredericton, New Brunswick, to determine a national champion for the 2008–09 CIS women's volleyball season. The tournament was played at the Aitken University Centre and was hosted by the University of New Brunswick. It was the second consecutive year that the University of New Brunswick had hosted the tournament following their first ever hosting duties in 2008.

The Canada West champion UBC Thunderbirds repeated as national champions following their five-set match victory over the fourth-seeded Calgary Dinos. The Thunderbirds became the first team to win consecutive championships since the Manitoba Bisons in 2001 and 2002.

Participating teams

Championship bracket

Consolation bracket

Awards

Championship awards 
CIS Tournament MVP – Kyla Richey, UBC
R.W. Pugh Fair Play Award – Angela Frawley, York

All-Star Team 
Marie-Christine Mondor, Laval
Laetitia Tchoualack, Montreal
Holly Harper, Calgary
Lauren Perry, Calgary
Kyla Richey, UBC
Marisa Field, UBC
Shanice Marcelle, UBC

References

External links 
 Tournament Web Site

U Sports volleyball
2009 in women's volleyball
University of New Brunswick